Hector Ramirez or Héctor Ramírez may refer to:

 Hector Ramirez (The Bold and the Beautiful), a character on the soap opera The Bold and the Beautiful
 Héctor Ramírez (baseball) (born 1971), former Major League Baseball player from the Dominican Republic
 Hector Ramirez (Sunbow), a fictional TV journalist in Sunbowverse animated cartoons The Transformers, G.I Joe and Inhumanoids
Héctor Ramírez (gymnast), Cuban Olympic gymnast
Héctor Ramírez (boxer), Cuban boxer
 Héctor Fernando Ramírez (died 2003), died of a heart attack in Guatemala City while being chased by a mob in what is referred to as jueves negro (Black Thursday)
 Héctor Ramírez (footballer) (born 1982), Colombian footballer